Rettig ICC is Europe's largest manufacturer of domestic heating systems, mainly household radiators; it is part of the larger Finnish Rettig Group.

History
It bought Myson Radiators of the UK in 2000, with Finimetal of France. Rettig bought Vogel & Noot Wärmetechnik in 2002. Rettig ICC was formed in 2003. It bought Emmeti of Italy in December 2015.

Structure

Rettig ICC is a shortened name for Rettig Indoor Climate Comfort. Myson Radiators, owned by Rettig ICC, is the second-largest manufacturer of radiators in the UK market, incorporated in March 1960, and have a factory in Gateshead on the Team Valley estate. It has its UK distribution centre on the Drum Industrial Estate, off the A693, in the north of Chester-le-Street in North Lodge in County Durham, east of Pelton. Rettig ICC is also the owner of Purmo radiators, the UK's fourth largest radiator manufacturer. 

Rettig Ireland is in Newcastle West, which has a valve factory. Rettig Germany is in Vienenburg in Lower Saxony.

It owns Vogel & Noot of Sankt Barbara im Mürztal in Austria and Finimetal of Villepinte in the north of Paris. Perttu Louhiluoto (Finnish, and a former director of Metso) is the Chief Executive since January 2018, who replaced Neil MacPherson, who had replaced Markus Lengauer and was a former managing Director of Rettig UK.

Products
 Myson radiators
Purmo radiators
Vogel & Noot radiators

See also
 Hans Sohlström, Chief Executive of Rettig Group

References

External links
 Rettig ICC
 Myson Radiators
 Finimetal
 Cold Air Intake for 5.7 Hemi Charger

2003 establishments in Finland
Beek
Economy of Tyne and Wear
Heating, ventilation, and air conditioning companies
Manufacturing companies established in 2003
Manufacturing companies of the Netherlands
Multinational companies headquartered in the Netherlands
Companies based in Limburg (Netherlands)